The 2015–16 Bowling Green Falcons men's basketball team represented Bowling Green State University during the 2015–16 NCAA Division I men's basketball season. The Falcons, led by first year head coach Michael Huger, played their home games at the Stroh Center as members of the East Division of the Mid-American Conference. They finished the season 16–18, 5–13 in MAC play to finish in last place in the East Division. They defeated Kent State and Central Michigan to advance to the semifinals of the MAC tournament where they lost to Akron.

Previous season
The Falcons finished the season 21–12, 11–7 in MAC play to finish in third place in the East Division. They advanced to the second round of the MAC tournament where they lost to Eastern Michigan. They received an invitation to the CollegeInsider.com Tournament where they defeated Saint Francis (PA) in the first round before losing in the second round to Canisius.

Departures

Incoming Transfers

Recruiting class of 2015

Roster

Schedule
Source: 

|-
!colspan=9 style="background:#F15C26; color:white;"|  Exhibition

|-
!colspan=9 style="background:#F15C26; color:white;"| Non-conference regular season

|-
!colspan=9 style="background:#F15C26; color:white;"| MAC regular season

|-
!colspan=9 style="background:#F15C26; color:white;"| MAC tournament

References

Bowling Green
Bowling Green Falcons men's basketball seasons